Arthur Brampton (1864–1955) was a British Liberal Party politician.

Brampton studied at King Edward's School, Birmingham and Bishop Vesey's Grammar School, before joining the family business, F. Brampton and Sons, which was soon renamed Brampton Brothers Ltd.  By the 1900s, Brampton was joint managing director.

Brampton travelled around Europe extensively, setting up business relationships, and also served as a director of the Birmingham Gazette.  He served as president of the Birmingham Liberal Association for almost twenty years, while from 1920 to 1931 he was the chairman of the National Liberal Federation, then from 1930 to 1933 he served as its president.

In 1943, Brampton retired as managing director of what had become Renold Chains, after a series of mergers.

References

1864 births
1955 deaths
chairs of the Liberal Party (UK)
Liberal Party (UK) parliamentary candidates
people educated at King Edward's School, Birmingham
people from Birmingham, West Midlands
presidents of the Liberal Party (UK)